Justin Edison (born March 18, 1989) is an American football defensive end for the Nebraska Danger of the Indoor Football League (IFL). He played college football for University of California, Los Angeles.

Professional career

San Jose SaberCats
On May 20, 2013, Edison was assigned to the SaberCats. Edison did not appear in any games for the SaberCats during the 2013 season. On September 6, 2013, the SaberCats picked up Edison's rookie option for the 2014 season.

Orlando Predators
On January 16, 2014, Edison was traded to the Orlando Predators for Jarvis Williams.

Nebraska Danger
On June 12, 2014, Edison signed with the Nebraska Danger of the Indoor Football League.

Tampa Bay Storm
On November 10, 2015, Edison was assigned to the Tampa Bay Storm.

References

External links
UCLA bio 
Arena Football bio 

1989 births
Living people
Players of American football from Los Angeles
UCLA Bruins football players
San Jose SaberCats players
Orlando Predators players
Nebraska Danger players
Tampa Bay Storm players